The Mayor of Nizhny Novgorod is head of the executive branch of the political system in Nizhny Novgorod, the Administration of Nizhny Novgorod. Since May 6, 2020 the position is occupied by Yury Shalabayev.

The mayor is not elected by popular vote, but appointed as a result of the closed vote of city council deputies.

Mayors of the city

Head of the city administration (2010 – 2017)

References 

Nizhny Novgorod
Politics of Nizhny Novgorod Oblast